Alvin Eugene Hall is a former professional American football player who played safety for six seasons for the Detroit Lions. Previously, Hall played at Dayton Fairview High School in Dayton, Ohio. Hall led the Bulldogs basketball team as the point guard to the first City Conference title in 33 years and played safety on the football team winning their division one year.

1958 births
Living people
American football safeties
Players of American football from Dayton, Ohio
Miami RedHawks football players
Detroit Lions players
National Football League replacement players